The 1922–23 season was Arsenal's fourth consecutive season in the top division of English football.

Results
Arsenal's score comes first

Legend

Football League First Division

Final League table

FA Cup

Arsenal entered the FA Cup in the first round proper, in which they were drawn to face Liverpool.

London FA Challenge Cup

See also

 1922–23 in English football
 List of Arsenal F.C. seasons

References

English football clubs 1922–23 season
1922-23